John Orchard FACSEP  (born 1967) is an Australian sport and exercise medicine physician, notable for advocating for rule changes in sport to improve player safety. In 2020 he was awarded a Member of the Order of the Order of Australia for significant service to sports medicine, particularly cricket. He is a member of the Australian government advisory group for sport responding to COVID, representing professional sport as the Chief Medical Officer for Cricket Australia  and has been instrumental in cricket's response to COVID.

Professional sporting teams
He has worked as doctor for the Sydney Swans, Sydney Roosters, NSW State of Origin rugby league team, Sydney Sixers, Cricket NSW and the Australian cricket team.

An incident which led to some infamy was his on-field use of a staple gun to close a head laceration sustained by Michael De Vere during a rugby league State of Origin match   
.

He also was the doctor on the field who responded to Phillip Hughes when he was felled by a cricket ball during a match in 2014, an injury from which the player later died.

Injury prevention advocacy

Australian Football League
He spent over 20 years as the injury surveillance coordinator for the AFL. During this time injury surveillance drove many rules changes in the league  including the centre-circle line (which reduced the rate of knee posterior cruciate ligament injuries in ruckmen)  and reductions in permitted interchange to prevent muscle strains.

National Rugby League
As Sydney Roosters doctor, he was outspoken on the need to ban the shoulder charge tackle in the NRL prior to this occurring.

Cricket
He campaigned for the introduction of substitutes for concussion in cricket and was the doctor at an Australian domestic game when this rule was first used in 2016. He was cited as having been a key driver of change when the International Cricket Council introduced Concussion substitutes in 2019, along with conducting research in general regarding concussion in cricket.

He also had a role in cricket making a boundary rope compulsory after reporting on injuries caused by fence collisions.

Research
He is an academic (Adjunct Professor) at the University of Sydney and has published over 200 research papers with over 10000 citations. He is a co-author on multiple International Olympic Committee consensus expert statements on preventing injuries in sport.

Orchard Sports Injury and Illness Classification System (OSIICS) 

John Orchard developed a sports injury classification system in 1993 called OSICS. It has been used by multiple sports in Australia, Europe  and the USA. In 2020, it was expanded to include further illness codes and adopted as one of two recommended systems by the International Olympic Committee.

References

External links
 https://www.sydney.edu.au/medicine-health/about/our-people/academic-staff/john-orchard.html

Living people
Australian sports physicians
Members of the Order of Australia
University of Melbourne alumni
1967 births
Australian medical researchers
People educated at Wesley College (Victoria)
Australian cricket administrators